The following is an incomplete list of county-maintained roads in Goodhue County, Minnesota, United States.

References

 
Goodhue